The 2001 Philadelphia Phillies season was the 119th season in the history of the franchise.

Offseason
November 29, 2000: Mark Brownson was released by the Philadelphia Phillies.
December 15, 2000: Ricky Bottalico was signed as a free agent with the Philadelphia Phillies.
January 29, 2001: Paul Byrd was signed as a free agent with the Philadelphia Phillies.

Regular season

Season standings

Record vs. opponents

Transactions
 June 5, 2001: Ryan Howard was drafted by the Philadelphia Phillies in the 5th round of the 2001 amateur draft. Player signed July 2, 2001.
 June 5, 2001: Paul Byrd was traded by the Philadelphia Phillies to the Kansas City Royals for Jose Santiago.
 June 7, 2001: Rob Ducey was released by the Philadelphia Phillies.
 July 23, 2001: Gary Bennett was traded by the New York Mets to the Philadelphia Phillies for Todd Pratt.
 July 27, 2001: Felipe Crespo was traded by the San Francisco Giants to the Philadelphia Phillies for Wayne Gomes.
 July 27, 2001: Turk Wendell was traded by the New York Mets with Dennis Cook to the Philadelphia Phillies for Bruce Chen and Adam Walker (minors).

2001 Game Log

|- style="background:#bfb"
| 1 || April 2 || @ Marlins || 6–5 (13) || Amaury Telemaco (1–0) || Vladimir Núñez (0–1) || None || 36,146 || 1–0
|- style="background:#bfb"
| 2 || April 3 || @ Marlins || 4–3 || Chris Brock (1–0) || Braden Looper (0–1) || José Mesa (1) || 10,257 || 2–0
|- style="background:#bfb"
| 3 || April 4 || @ Marlins || 7–3 || Rhéal Cormier (1–0) || Dan Miceli (0–1) || None || 8,493 || 3–0
|- style="background:#fbb"
| 4 || April 6 || Cubs || 2–3 || Julián Tavárez (1–0) || Randy Wolf (0–1) || Jeff Fassero (2) || 36,380 || 3–1
|- style="background:#fbb"
| 5 || April 7 || Cubs || 4–8 || Jason Bere (1–0) || Vicente Padilla (0–1) || None || 16,847 || 3–2
|- style="background:#bfb"
| 6 || April 8 || Cubs || 3–1 || Robert Person (1–0) || Jon Lieber (0–1) || José Mesa (2) || 15,550 || 4–2
|- style="background:#bfb"
| 7 || April 9 || Marlins || 5–4 || Ricky Bottalico (1–0) || Ricky Bones (0–1) || None || 11,311 || 5–2
|- style="background:#bfb"
| 8 || April 10 || Marlins || 7–6 || Wayne Gomes (1–0) || Antonio Alfonseca (0–1) || José Mesa (3) || 11,376 || 6–2
|- style="background:#bbb"
| – || April 11 || Marlins || colspan=6 | Postponed (rain); Makeup: June 28 as a traditional double-header
|- style="background:#fbb"
| 9 || April 13 || @ Braves || 2–4 || Tom Glavine (1–1) || Randy Wolf (0–2) || John Rocker (3) || 31,017 || 6–3
|- style="background:#bfb"
| 10 || April 14 || @ Braves || 2–1 || Omar Daal (1–0) || Kevin Millwood (0–2) || José Mesa (4) || 35,979 || 7–3
|- style="background:#fbb"
| 11 || April 15 || @ Braves || 0–3 || Odalis Pérez (1–1) || Robert Person (1–1) || John Rocker (4) || 24,472 || 7–4
|- style="background:#bbb"
| – || April 16 || @ Cubs || colspan=6 | Postponed (rain); Makeup: April 18 as a traditional double-header
|- style="background:#bfb"
| 12 || April 17 || @ Cubs || 6–3 || Vicente Padilla (1–1) || Jeff Fassero (0–1) || José Mesa (5) || 18,189 || 8–4
|- style="background:#fbb"
| 13 || April 18 (1) || @ Cubs || 3–4 || Kevin Tapani (3–0) || Bruce Chen (0–1) || Jeff Fassero (7) || see 2nd game || 8–5
|- style="background:#fbb"
| 14 || April 18 (2) || @ Cubs || 3–5 || Jason Bere (3–0) || Randy Wolf (0–3) || Jeff Fassero (8) || 26,793 || 8–6
|- style="background:#bfb"
| 15 || April 20 || Braves || 8–3 || Wayne Gomes (2–0) || Odalis Pérez (1–2) || None || 16,245 || 9–6
|- style="background:#bfb"
| 16 || April 21 || Braves || 4–1 || Robert Person (2–1) || Greg Maddux (2–1) || None || 17,123 || 10–6
|- style="background:#bfb"
| 17 || April 22 || Braves || 3–2 || Amaury Telemaco (2–0) || John Burkett (0–3) || Wayne Gomes (1) || 26,756 || 11–6
|- style="background:#bfb"
| 18 || April 23 || @ Padres || 5–3 || Bruce Chen (1–1) || Adam Eaton (2–2) || Ricky Bottalico (1) || 42,932 || 12–6
|- style="background:#bfb"
| 19 || April 24 || @ Padres || 12–7 || Randy Wolf (1–3) || Woody Williams (1–3) || None || 13,872 || 13–6
|- style="background:#bfb"
| 20 || April 25 || @ Padres || 5–3 || Omar Daal (2–0) || Brian Tollberg (1–2) || José Mesa (6) || 12,573 || 14–6
|- style="background:#fbb"
| 21 || April 26 || @ Padres || 0–11 || Kevin Jarvis (1–2) || Robert Person (2–2) || None || 12,785 || 14–7
|- style="background:#fbb"
| 22 || April 27 || @ Dodgers || 3–4 || Terry Adams (2–1) || Wayne Gomes (2–1) || None || 40,643 || 14–8
|- style="background:#fbb"
| 23 || April 28 || @ Dodgers || 6–7 || Matt Herges (1–1) || Ricky Bottalico (1–1) || Jeff Shaw (7) || 37,322 || 14–9
|- style="background:#fbb"
| 24 || April 29 || @ Dodgers || 1–4 || Chan Ho Park (3–2) || Randy Wolf (1–4) || Jeff Shaw (8) || 43,589 || 14–10
|-

|- style="background:#bfb"
| 25 || May 1 || Rockies || 7–1 || Omar Daal (3–0) || Denny Neagle (2–1) || None || 14,138 || 15–10
|- style="background:#fbb"
| 26 || May 2 || Rockies || 2–6 || Brian Bohanon (1–3) || Robert Person (2–3) || José Jiménez (7) || 13,243 || 15–11
|- style="background:#bfb"
| 27 || May 3 || Rockies || 7–5 || Amaury Telemaco (3–0) || Pedro Astacio (3–2) || None || 17,383 || 16–11
|- style="background:#fbb"
| 28 || May 4 || Giants || 2–4 || Liván Hernández (2–4) || Bruce Chen (1–2) || Robb Nen (8) || 20,713 || 16–12
|- style="background:#bfb"
| 29 || May 5 || Giants || 4–2 || Randy Wolf (2–4) || Aaron Fultz (2–1) || José Mesa (7) || 17,887 || 17–12
|- style="background:#bfb"
| 30 || May 6 || Giants || 10–8 || Omar Daal (4–0) || Kirk Rueter (3–3) || José Mesa (8) || 25,206 || 18–12
|- style="background:#bfb"
| 31 || May 7 || @ Astros || 5–0 || Robert Person (3–3) || Kent Bottenfield (1–2) || None || 31,511 || 19–12
|- style="background:#bfb"
| 32 || May 8 || @ Astros || 3–2 || Amaury Telemaco (4–0) || Mike Jackson (0–1) || José Mesa (9) || 31,278 || 20–12
|- style="background:#fbb"
| 33 || May 9 || @ Astros || 6–7 || Billy Wagner (2–1) || Ricky Bottalico (1–2) || None || 31,769 || 20–13
|- style="background:#bfb"
| 34 || May 11 || @ Diamondbacks || 5–1 || Randy Wolf (3–4) || Curt Schilling (5–1) || None || 30,291 || 21–13
|- style="background:#bfb"
| 35 || May 12 || @ Diamondbacks || 6–5 (10) || Ricky Bottalico (2–2) || Miguel Batista (1–2) || José Mesa (10) || 33,515 || 22–13
|- style="background:#fbb"
| 36 || May 13 || @ Diamondbacks || 1–6 || Randy Johnson (4–3) || Robert Person (3–4) || None || 32,223 || 22–14
|- style="background:#fbb"
| 37 || May 15 || Brewers || 10–14 || Curtis Leskanic (2–2) || Ricky Bottalico (2–3) || None || 12,307 || 22–15
|- style="background:#fbb"
| 38 || May 16 || Brewers || 1–6 || Jimmy Haynes (4–4) || Bruce Chen (1–3) || None || 12,105 || 22–16
|- style="background:#bfb"
| 39 || May 17 || Brewers || 2–1 (12) || Wayne Gomes (3–1) || Mike DeJean (2–1) || None || 12,433 || 23–16
|- style="background:#bfb"
| 40 || May 18 || Cardinals || 5–4 || Omar Daal (5–0) || Mike Timlin (1–2) || José Mesa (11) || 17,085 || 24–16
|- style="background:#bfb"
| 41 || May 19 || Cardinals || 3–2 || Robert Person (4–4) || Andy Benes (3–3) || None || 24,499 || 25–16
|- style="background:#fbb"
| 42 || May 20 || Cardinals || 1–3 || Dustin Hermanson (5–1) || Amaury Telemaco (4–1) || Dave Veres (5) || 31,391 || 25–17
|- style="background:#bbb"
| – || May 22 || Pirates || colspan=6 | Postponed (rain); Makeup: May 23 as a traditional double-header
|- style="background:#bfb"
| 43 || May 23 (1) || Pirates || 4–0 || Randy Wolf (4–4) || Jason Schmidt (1–2) || Ricky Bottalico (2) || see 2nd game || 26–17
|- style="background:#bfb"
| 44 || May 23 (2) || Pirates || 5–2 || Omar Daal (6–0) || Omar Olivares (2–5) || José Mesa (12) || 13,337 || 27–17
|- style="background:#bfb"
| 45 || May 24 || Pirates || 6–5 || Rhéal Cormier (2–0) || Scott Sauerbeck (0–2) || José Mesa (13) || 12,287 || 28–17
|- style="background:#bfb"
| 46 || May 25 || Expos || 10–8 || Eddie Oropesa (1–0) || Ugueth Urbina (0–1) || None || 12,538 || 29–17
|- style="background:#bbb"
| – || May 26 || Expos || colspan=6 | Postponed (rain); Makeup: May 27 as a traditional double-header
|- style="background:#bfb"
| 47 || May 27 (1) || Expos || 7–5 || Chris Brock (2–0) || Britt Reames (2–7) || José Mesa (14) || see 2nd game || 30–17
|- style="background:#fbb"
| 48 || May 27 (2) || Expos || 3–7 || Tony Armas Jr. (5–5) || Paul Byrd (0–1) || None || 22,451 || 30–18
|- style="background:#bfb"
| 49 || May 28 || @ Mets || 5–3 (10) || José Mesa (1–0) || Armando Benítez (3–2) || Rhéal Cormier (1) || 33,791 || 31–18
|- style="background:#bfb"
| 50 || May 29 || @ Mets || 7–3 || Wayne Gomes (4–1) || Dennis Cook (1–1) || None || 26,579 || 32–18
|- style="background:#bfb"
| 51 || May 30 || @ Mets || 6–3 || Vicente Padilla (2–1) || John Franco (1–1) || José Mesa (15) || 24,077 || 33–18
|- style="background:#bfb"
| 52 || May 31 || @ Expos || 5–2 || Rhéal Cormier (3–0) || Scott Strickland (0–2) || José Mesa (16) || 5,042 || 34–18
|-

|- style="background:#bfb"
| 53 || June 1 || @ Expos || 13–2 || Bruce Chen (2–3) || Britt Reames (2–8) || None || 5,267 || 35–18
|- style="background:#fbb"
| 54 || June 2 || @ Expos || 5–12 || Tony Armas Jr. (6–5) || Randy Wolf (4–5) || None || 7,810 || 35–19
|- style="background:#fbb"
| 55 || June 3 || @ Expos || 3–10 || Masato Yoshii (2–2) || Omar Daal (6–1) || None || 6,504 || 35–20
|- style="background:#fbb"
| 56 || June 5 || Mets || 0–9 || Rick Reed (6–2) || Robert Person (4–5) || None || 22,060 || 35–21
|- style="background:#bfb"
| 57 || June 6 || Mets || 6–1 || Amaury Telemaco (5–1) || Glendon Rusch (3–5) || None || 32,703 || 36–21
|- style="background:#fbb"
| 58 || June 7 || Mets || 5–6 || John Franco (2–1) || José Mesa (1–1) || Armando Benítez (9) || 20,636 || 36–22
|- style="background:#fbb"
| 59 || June 8 || @ Red Sox || 2–3 || David Cone (1–1) || Randy Wolf (4–6) || Derek Lowe (7) || 33,435 || 36–23
|- style="background:#bfb"
| 60 || June 9 || @ Red Sox || 5–2 || Omar Daal (7–1) || Pedro Martínez (7–2) || José Mesa (17) || 32,944 || 37–23
|- style="background:#fbb"
| 61 || June 10 || @ Red Sox || 4–5 || Hideo Nomo (6–3) || Rhéal Cormier (3–1) || Derek Lowe (8) || 32,767 || 37–24
|- style="background:#fbb"
| 62 || June 12 || @ Devil Rays || 5–9 || Joe Kennedy (2–0) || Amaury Telemaco (5–2) || None || 12,602 || 37–25
|- style="background:#fbb"
| 63 || June 13 || @ Devil Rays || 3–5 || Bryan Rekar (1–7) || Ricky Bottalico (2–4) || Esteban Yan (7) || 10,539 || 37–26
|- style="background:#fbb"
| 64 || June 14 || @ Devil Rays || 3–6 || Ryan Rupe (4–5) || Randy Wolf (4–7) || Esteban Yan (8) || 11,606 || 37–27
|- style="background:#bfb"
| 65 || June 15 || Orioles || 15–7 || Vicente Padilla (3–1) || Willis Roberts (5–6) || None || 18,710 || 38–27
|- style="background:#bfb"
| 66 || June 16 || Orioles || 14–6 || Chris Brock (3–0) || B. J. Ryan (2–3) || None || 21,796 || 39–27
|- style="background:#fbb"
| 67 || June 17 || Orioles || 7–10 || José Mercedes (2–8) || Amaury Telemaco (5–3) || None || 36,911 || 39–28
|- style="background:#fbb"
| 68 || June 19 || @ Pirates || 5–8 || Joe Beimel (3–2) || Bruce Chen (2–4) || Scott Sauerbeck (1) || 33,713 || 39–29
|- style="background:#bfb"
| 69 || June 20 || @ Pirates || 9–5 || Omar Daal (8–1) || Bronson Arroyo (3–6) || None || 28,145 || 40–29
|- style="background:#bfb"
| 70 || June 21 || @ Pirates || 6–3 || Robert Person (5–5) || Jimmy Anderson (4–7) || José Mesa (18) || 29,560 || 41–29
|- style="background:#fbb"
| 71 || June 22 || @ Marlins || 1–8 || Ryan Dempster (8–7) || Randy Wolf (4–8) || None || 16,321 || 41–30
|- style="background:#fbb"
| 72 || June 23 || @ Marlins || 1–12 || Matt Clement (4–5) || Amaury Telemaco (5–4) || None || 23,638 || 41–31
|- style="background:#bfb"
| 73 || June 24 || @ Marlins || 9–3 || Bruce Chen (3–4) || Chuck Smith (4–3) || None || 17,697 || 42–31
|- style="background:#fbb"
| 74 || June 25 || Braves || 4–9 || Greg Maddux (8–5) || Omar Daal (8–2) || None || 22,439 || 42–32
|- style="background:#fbb"
| 75 || June 26 || Braves || 1–4 (11) || Mike Remlinger (3–1) || Wayne Gomes (4–2) || José Cabrera (1) || 23,747 || 42–33
|- style="background:#fbb"
| 76 || June 27 || Braves || 4–10 || Odalis Pérez (6–5) || Randy Wolf (4–9) || None || 31,991 || 42–34
|- style="background:#bfb"
| 77 || June 28 (1) || Marlins || 6–5 || Robert Person (6–5) || Ryan Dempster (8–8) || José Mesa (19) || see 2nd game || 43–34
|- style="background:#bfb"
| 78 || June 28 (2) || Marlins || 8–7 || Rhéal Cormier (4–1) || Braden Looper (3–3) || José Mesa (20) || 18,094 || 44–34
|- style="background:#bfb"
| 79 || June 29 || Marlins || 5–0 || Bruce Chen (4–4) || Chuck Smith (4–4) || None || 36,433 || 45–34
|- style="background:#bfb"
| 80 || June 30 || Marlins || 6–4 || Omar Daal (9–2) || A. J. Burnett (5–5) || José Mesa (21) || 45,207 || 46–34
|-

|- style="background:#bfb"
| 81 || July 1 || Marlins || 8–1 || Nelson Figueroa (1–0) || Brad Penny (7–2) || None || 20,078 || 47–34
|- style="background:#fbb"
| 82 || July 3 || @ Braves || 7–14 || José Cabrera (5–2) || José Santiago (2–3) || None || 34,142 || 47–35
|- style="background:#bfb"
| 83 || July 4 || @ Braves || 4–1 || David Coggin (1–0) || Odalis Pérez (6–6) || José Mesa (22) || 46,579 || 48–35
|- style="background:#fbb"
| 84 || July 5 || @ Braves || 5–9 || Greg Maddux (10–5) || Bruce Chen (4–5) || None || 32,031 || 48–36
|- style="background:#bfb"
| 85 || July 6 || @ Orioles || 3–2 (10) || Rhéal Cormier (5–1) || Mike Trombley (2–2) || José Mesa (23) || 40,086 || 49–36
|- style="background:#fbb"
| 86 || July 7 || @ Orioles || 3–4 || Jason Johnson (8–5) || Nelson Figueroa (1–1) || Buddy Groom (6) || 49,072 || 49–37
|- style="background:#bfb"
| 87 || July 8 || @ Orioles || 5–4 || Randy Wolf (5–9) || Buddy Groom (1–3) || José Mesa (24) || 47,210 || 50–37
|- style="background:#bbcaff;"
| – || July 10 ||colspan="7" |2001 Major League Baseball All-Star Game at Safeco Field in Seattle
|- style="background:#fbb"
| 88 || July 12 || Blue Jays || 1–2 (11) || Kelvim Escobar (1–4) || José Santiago (2–4) || Billy Koch (17) || 20,306 || 50–38
|- style="background:#bfb"
| 89 || July 13 || Blue Jays || 5–2 || Omar Daal (10–2) || Dan Plesac (2–3) || José Mesa (25) || 18,279 || 51–38
|- style="background:#fbb"
| 90 || July 14 || Blue Jays || 2–4 || Joey Hamilton (5–6) || Nelson Figueroa (1–2) || Billy Koch (18) || 22,418 || 51–39
|- style="background:#bfb"
| 91 || July 15 || Yankees || 9–3 || Robert Person (7–5) || Andy Pettitte (9–5) || None || 59,470 || 52–39
|- style="background:#fbb"
| 92 || July 16 || Yankees || 3–6 (13) || Mike Stanton (7–2) || Amaury Telemaco (5–5) || Mariano Rivera (30) || 46,446 || 52–40
|- style="background:#fbb"
| 93 || July 17 || Yankees || 1–4 (12) || Randy Choate (3–1) || Wayne Gomes (4–3) || Mariano Rivera (31) || 47,529 || 52–41
|- style="background:#fbb"
| 94 || July 18 || @ Expos || 6–7 || Ugueth Urbina (1–1) || Rhéal Cormier (5–2) || None || 5,157 || 52–42
|- style="background:#fbb"
| 95 || July 19 || @ Expos || 2–5 || Scott Strickland (2–4) || Rhéal Cormier (5–3) || Ugueth Urbina (14) || 10,242 || 52–43
|- style="background:#bfb"
| 96 || July 20 || Mets || 10–1 || Robert Person (8–5) || Rick Reed (8–5) || None || 22,886 || 53–43
|- style="background:#fbb"
| 97 || July 21 || Mets || 3–6 || Steve Trachsel (4–10) || Randy Wolf (5–10) || Armando Benítez (23) || 33,181 || 53–44
|- style="background:#bfb"
| 98 || July 22 || Mets || 3–2 || José Santiago (3–4) || John Franco (4–2) || José Mesa (26) || 30,812 || 54–44
|- style="background:#fbb"
| 99 || July 23 || Expos || 0–3 || Javier Vázquez (9–9) || Omar Daal (10–3) || None || 16,921 || 54–45
|- style="background:#bfb"
| 100 || July 24 || Expos || 10–2 || Nelson Figueroa (2–2) || Tony Armas Jr. (8–9) || None || 16,699 || 55–45
|- style="background:#bfb"
| 101 || July 25 || Expos || 8–4 || Robert Person (9–5) || Mike Thurman (5–7) || None || 27,555 || 56–45
|- style="background:#bfb"
| 102 || July 26 || @ Mets || 3–2 || José Santiago (4–4) || Rick Reed (8–6) || José Mesa (27) || 38,468 || 57–45
|- style="background:#fbb"
| 103 || July 27 || @ Mets || 1–6 || Steve Trachsel (5–10) || David Coggin (1–1) || None || 31,263 || 57–46
|- style="background:#fbb"
| 104 || July 28 || @ Mets || 3–4 || Armando Benítez (4–3) || Turk Wendell (4–4) || None || 38,972 || 57–47
|- style="background:#fbb"
| 105 || July 29 || @ Mets || 5–6 || Armando Benítez (5–3) || Rhéal Cormier (5–4) || None || 38,536 || 57–48
|- style="background:#fbb"
| 106 || July 31 || @ Rockies || 6–7 || José Jiménez (5–1) || Rhéal Cormier (5–5) || None || 36,005 || 57–49
|-

|- style="background:#bfb"
| 107 || August 1 || @ Rockies || 8–1 (6) || Randy Wolf (6–10) || Denny Neagle (6–6) || None || 34,024 || 58–49
|- style="background:#bfb"
| 108 || August 2 || @ Rockies || 4–2 || David Coggin (2–1) || John Thomson (0–4) || José Mesa (28) || 37,075 || 59–49
|- style="background:#fbb"
| 109 || August 3 || @ Giants || 2–4 || Félix Rodríguez (6–1) || Rhéal Cormier (5–6) || None || 41,679 || 59–50
|- style="background:#bfb"
| 110 || August 4 || @ Giants || 12–2 || Nelson Figueroa (3–2) || Shawn Estes (8–6) || None || 41,720 || 60–50
|- style="background:#fbb"
| 111 || August 5 || @ Giants || 4–8 || Liván Hernández (10–11) || Robert Person (9–6) || None || 41,650 || 60–51
|- style="background:#bfb"
| 112 || August 7 || Padres || 7–3 || Brandon Duckworth (1–0) || Bobby J. Jones (7–14) || None || 19,465 || 61–51
|- style="background:#bfb"
| 113 || August 8 || Padres || 4–3 || David Coggin (3–1) || Junior Herndon (0–1) || José Mesa (29) || 24,202 || 62–51
|- style="background:#fbb"
| 114 || August 9 || Padres || 2–6 || Kevin Jarvis (9–9) || Omar Daal (10–4) || None || 21,587 || 62–52
|- style="background:#bfb"
| 115 || August 10 || Dodgers || 10–5 || Nelson Figueroa (4–2) || James Baldwin (8–6) || None || 16,298 || 63–52
|- style="background:#bfb"
| 116 || August 11 || Dodgers || 7–3 || Robert Person (10–6) || Éric Gagné (4–5) || None || 25,344 || 64–52
|- style="background:#bfb"
| 117 || August 12 || Dodgers || 3–2 || Brandon Duckworth (2–0) || Terry Adams (8–5) || José Mesa (30) || 21,477 || 65–52
|- style="background:#bfb"
| 118 || August 14 || @ Brewers || 10–4 || David Coggin (4–1) || Allen Levrault (5–8) || None || 34,277 || 66–52
|- style="background:#bfb"
| 119 || August 15 || @ Brewers || 8–6 || Omar Daal (11–4) || Jamey Wright (8–8) || José Mesa (31) || 31,030 || 67–52
|- style="background:#fbb"
| 120 || August 16 || @ Brewers || 4–5 || Rubén Quevedo (2–1) || Nelson Figueroa (4–3) || Curtis Leskanic (13) || 34,110 || 67–53
|- style="background:#fbb"
| 121 || August 17 || @ Cardinals || 3–4 || Dave Veres (3–2) || Turk Wendell (4–5) || None || 38,431 || 67–54
|- style="background:#fbb"
| 122 || August 18 || @ Cardinals || 3–6 || Steve Kline (3–3) || Cliff Politte (0–1) || Dave Veres (15) || 45,437 || 67–55
|- style="background:#fbb"
| 123 || August 19 || @ Cardinals || 0–9 || Matt Morris (16–7) || David Coggin (4–2) || None || 38,265 || 67–56
|- style="background:#fbb"
| 124 || August 21 || Astros || 2–8 || Pedro Astacio (8–14) || Nelson Figueroa (4–4) || None || 20,647 || 67–57
|- style="background:#bfb"
| 125 || August 22 || Astros || 2–1 || Robert Person (11–6) || Wade Miller (13–7) || José Mesa (32) || 21,288 || 68–57
|- style="background:#fbb"
| 126 || August 23 || Astros || 1–2 (11) || Mike Jackson (4–2) || José Santiago (4–5) || Billy Wagner (29) || 16,062 || 68–58
|- style="background:#bfb"
| 127 || August 24 || Diamondbacks || 6–5 || Omar Daal (12–4) || Brian Anderson (3–9) || José Mesa (33) || 35,173 || 69–58
|- style="background:#fbb"
| 128 || August 25 || Diamondbacks || 3–4 || Miguel Batista (9–7) || David Coggin (4–3) || Byung-hyun Kim (13) || 23,953 || 69–59
|- style="background:#fbb"
| 129 || August 26 || Diamondbacks || 3–4 (10) || Byung-hyun Kim (4–3) || Cliff Politte (0–2) || None || 35,093 || 69–60
|- style="background:#bfb"
| 130 || August 27 || Diamondbacks || 3–1 || Robert Person (12–6) || Albie Lopez (8–16) || José Mesa (34) || 18,303 || 70–60
|- style="background:#bfb"
| 131 || August 28 || @ Mets || 9–6 (11) || Cliff Politte (1–2) || Donne Wall (0–4) || Ricky Bottalico (3) || 21,745 || 71–60
|- style="background:#fbb"
| 132 || August 29 || @ Mets || 5–7 || Bruce Chen (7–6) || Omar Daal (12–5) || Armando Benítez (34) || 24,144 || 71–61
|- style="background:#fbb"
| 133 || August 30 || @ Mets || 2–6 || Steve Trachsel (8–11) || David Coggin (4–4) || None || 33,734 || 71–62
|- style="background:#fbb"
| 134 || August 31 || Expos || 1–5 || Mike Thurman (7–10) || Nelson Figueroa (4–5) || Scott Strickland (4) || 14,272 || 71–63
|-

|- style="background:#bfb"
| 135 || September 1 || Expos || 4–1 || Robert Person (13–6) || Carl Pavano (0–3) || José Mesa (35) || 16,770 || 72–63
|- style="background:#fbb"
| 136 || September 2 || Expos || 2–6 || Javier Vázquez (15–11) || José Mesa (1–2) || None || 20,871 || 72–64
|- style="background:#fbb"
| 137 || September 3 || Mets || 7–10 || C. J. Nitkowski (1–3) || José Mesa (1–3) || Armando Benítez (35) || 26,891 || 72–65
|- style="background:#fbb"
| 138 || September 4 || Mets || 3–5 || Steve Trachsel (9–11) || Omar Daal (12–6) || Armando Benítez (36) || 14,020 || 72–66
|- style="background:#fbb"
| 139 || September 5 || Mets || 4–7 || Al Leiter (11–10) || David Coggin (4–5) || None || 16,089 || 72–67
|- style="background:#bfb"
| 140 || September 6 || @ Expos || 3–0 || Robert Person (14–6) || Carl Pavano (0–4) || José Mesa (36) || 3,406 || 73–67
|- style="background:#fbb"
| 141 || September 7 || @ Expos || 2–4 || Javier Vázquez (16–11) || Brandon Duckworth (2–1) || Scott Stewart (3) || 4,451 || 73–68
|- style="background:#bfb"
| 142 || September 8 || @ Expos || 6–0 || Randy Wolf (7–10) || Tomo Ohka (3–8) || None || 5,650 || 74–68
|- style="background:#bfb"
| 143 || September 9 || @ Expos || 12–4 || Cliff Politte (2–2) || Graeme Lloyd (8–5) || None || 5,480 || 75–68
|- style="background:#bbb"
| – || September 11–13 || @ Braves || colspan=6 | Postponed (September 11 attacks); Makeup: October 2–4
|- style="background:#bbb"
| – || September 14–16 || @ Reds || colspan=6 | Postponed (September 11 attacks); Makeup: October 5–7
|- style="background:#bfb"
| 144 || September 17 || Braves || 5–2 || Robert Person (15–6) || Greg Maddux (17–9) || José Mesa (37) || 27,910 || 76–68
|- style="background:#bfb"
| 145 || September 18 || Braves || 4–3 || Ricky Bottalico (3–4) || John Smoltz (2–3) || None || 23,653 || 77–68
|- style="background:#bfb"
| 146 || September 19 || Braves || 5–2 || David Coggin (5–5) || John Burkett (11–11) || José Mesa (38) || 24,036 || 78–68
|- style="background:#fbb"
| 147 || September 20 || Braves || 1–5 || Kevin Millwood (6–6) || Randy Wolf (7–11) || None || 26,863 || 78–69
|- style="background:#bfb"
| 148 || September 21 || Marlins || 1–0 || José Mesa (2–3) || Vladimir Núñez (4–5) || None || 15,129 || 79–69
|- style="background:#fbb"
| 149 || September 22 || Marlins || 2–3 || Matt Clement (9–10) || José Santiago (4–6) || Antonio Alfonseca (27) || 23,017 || 79–70
|- style="background:#bfb"
| 150 || September 23 || Marlins || 5–4 (10) || José Mesa (3–3) || Juan Acevedo (1–4) || None || 29,109 || 80–70
|- style="background:#fbb"
| 151 || September 25 || Reds || 1–8 || Joey Hamilton (6–9) || David Coggin (5–6) || None || 14,863 || 80–71
|- style="background:#bfb"
| 152 || September 26 || Reds || 8–0 || Randy Wolf (8–11) || Jared Fernández (0–1) || None || 17,169 || 81–71
|- style="background:#fbb"
| 153 || September 27 || Reds || 1–2 || Lance Davis (8–3) || Omar Daal (12–7) || Danny Graves (29) || 38,602 || 81–72
|- style="background:#fbb"
| 154 || September 28 || @ Marlins || 5–6 (10) || Antonio Alfonseca (4–4) || Cliff Politte (2–3) || None || 12,199 || 81–73
|- style="background:#bfb"
| 155 || September 29 || @ Marlins || 5–4 || Brandon Duckworth (3–1) || Brad Penny (9–10) || José Mesa (39) || 19,732 || 82–73
|- style="background:#fbb"
| 156 || September 30 || @ Marlins || 3–8 || Josh Beckett (2–1) || David Coggin (5–7) || None || 11,041 || 82–74
|-

|- style="background:#bfb"
| 157 || October 2 || @ Braves || 3–1 || Randy Wolf (9–11) || Greg Maddux (17–11) || José Mesa (40) || 30,739 || 83–74
|- style="background:#fbb"
| 158 || October 3 || @ Braves || 3–8 || Tom Glavine (16–7) || Robert Person (15–7) || None || 27,431 || 83–75
|- style="background:#fbb"
| 159 || October 4 || @ Braves || 2–6 || John Burkett (12–12) || Brandon Duckworth (3–2) || None || 32,283 || 83–76
|- style="background:#bbb"
| – || October 5 || @ Reds || colspan=6 | Postponed (rain); Makeup: October 6 as a traditional double-header
|- style="background:#bfb"
| 160 || October 6 (1) || @ Reds || 2–1 || Omar Daal (13–7) || Elmer Dessens (10–14) || José Mesa (41) || see 2nd game || 84–76
|- style="background:#bfb"
| 161 || October 6 (2) || @ Reds || 5–1 || David Coggin (6–7) || Joey Hamilton (6–10) || None || 22,886 || 85–76
|- style="background:#bfb"
| 162 || October 7 || @ Reds || 4–1 || Randy Wolf (10–11) || Lance Davis (8–4) || José Mesa' (42) || 20,093 || 86–76
|-

Roster

Player stats

Batting

Starters by positionNote: Pos = Position; G = Games played; AB = At bats; H = Hits; Avg. = Batting average; HR = Home runs; RBI = Runs batted inOther battersNote: G = Games played; AB = At bats; H = Hits; Avg. = Batting average; HR = Home runs; RBI = Runs batted inPitching

Starting pitchersNote: G = Games pitched; IP = Innings pitched; W = Wins; L = Losses; ERA = Earned run average; SO = StrikeoutsOther pitchersNote: G = Games pitched; IP = Innings pitched; W = Wins; L = Losses; ERA = Earned run average; SO = StrikeoutsRelief pitchersNote: G = Games pitched; W = Wins; L = Losses; SV = Saves; ERA = Earned run average; SO = Strikeouts Farm system 

LEAGUE CO-CHAMPIONS: ReadingBaseball America 2002 Directory

References

2001 Philadelphia Phillies season at Baseball Reference''

Philadelphia Phillies seasons
Philadelphia Phillies Season, 2001
Philadelphia Phillies